"I går, i dag" is a song written by Bert Månson, and performed by Sanna Nielsen at Melodifestivalen 2001, where it ended up third. In 2001, the song was also released as a single, peaking at #32 at the Swedish singles chat. The song also charted at Svensktoppen for 14 weeks between the period of 24 March-23 June 2001 before leaving the chart. peaking at second position. Using the Svensktoppen calculation system, the song became 9th most successful Svensktoppen song of 2001.

The single B-side was the same song with lyrics in English: "Still too Young".

Track listing
I går, i dag
Still too Young (I går, i dag)

Charts

References

External links
Information at Svensk mediedatabas

2001 songs
2001 singles
Melodifestivalen songs of 2001
Sanna Nielsen songs
Swedish-language songs
Songs written by Bert Månson